The Site of the CPC Shandong Provincial Committee Secretariat is located in the Tianqiao District of Jinan, Shandong Province, China. It has been placed on the list of Major historical and cultural sites protected by Shandong Province as a "revolutionary site" on December 23, 1977 (site number 1-04).

Location
The street address of the site is East Liushui Alley 105 (东流水街105号). It is located off Dikou Road, about 300 meters to the west of the intersection between Dikou Road and Jiluo Road.

See also
List of sites in Jinan
Major historical and cultural sites protected by Shandong Province

References

Tourist attractions in Jinan